The church of the Madonna del Giglio is a Roman Catholic church located in Acquasparta, Province of Terni, region of Umbria, Italy.

The stone church dates to the 1600s and houses a number of contemporary frescoes.

References

Churches in the province of Terni
17th-century Roman Catholic church buildings in Italy